The Block may refer to:

Places
 The Block (Sydney), well-known street block in Redfern, an inner-city suburb of Sydney
 The Outlets at Orange, formerly known as the Block at Orange, an open-air shopping and entertainment mall located in Southern California
 The Block (Baltimore), an adult entertainment area
 The Block (Philippines), one of two annex buildings in SM City North EDSA located in North Avenue, Quezon City

Entertainment
 A set of TV series of similar format:
 The Block (Australian TV series)
 The Block (UK TV series)
 The Block NZ
 The Block (Israeli TV series)
 Het Blok
 The Block (album), the fifth studio album from the New Kids On The Block
 WUAB, a TV station in Cleveland, Ohio known as My43 The Block

Sports
 The Block (American Football) - Jerry Kramer's block in the 1967 NFL Championship Game that led to the winning touchdown
 The Block (basketball) - LeBron James' block of an Andre Iguodala shot in Game 7 of the 2016 NBA Finals

Other 
 The Block (Brack), a 1954 artwork by Australian painter John Brack
Bloc Québécois, a Canadian political party often referred to as "The Bloc"
 The wooden block used in the beheading of a condemned person with an axe

See also 
 Block (disambiguation)